Garret Lee Dillahunt (born November 24, 1964) is an American actor. He is best known for his work in television, including the roles Burt Chance on the Fox sitcom Raising Hope, for which he was nominated for the Critics' Choice Television Award for Best Actor in a Comedy Series, Jack McCall and Francis Wolcott in Deadwood, and John Dorie in Fear the Walking Dead (2018–2021). He has also appeared in The 4400, ER, Terminator: The Sarah Connor Chronicles, Justified, and The Mindy Project (2015–2017). He starred in the Amazon Studios drama series Hand of God (2014–2017).

In film, Dillahunt has played supporting roles in No Country for Old Men, The Assassination of Jesse James by the Coward Robert Ford, Winter's Bone, Looper, and 12 Years a Slave.

Early life and education
Dillahunt was born in Castro Valley, California, and grew up in Selah, Washington. He was born into a family of three boys, with two brothers: Brett and Eric; Eric died in 1981 in Yakima, Washington, after the car he was travelling in as a passenger, whose driver was drunk and speeding at the time, veered off the road. His brother Brett is a teacher.

Dillahunt graduated from the University of Washington with a B.A. in journalism and from New York University's Graduate Acting Program with an M.F.A. in acting.

Career
After spending years on and off Broadway, Dillahunt began pursuing television and film roles. He appeared as a regular in several short lived series on ABC and Showtime, and landed guest spots on TV shows such as The X-Files and NYPD Blue among others, before playing two distinctly different characters on the HBO series Deadwood: Jack McCall in 2004 and Francis Wolcott in 2005 (Dillahunt returned in an uncredited role as a townsman in the 2019 Deadwood movie). He later had a recurring role on USA Network's The 4400.

Dillahunt portrayed Steve Curtis for three seasons on ER (2005–06). Later roles included Dr. Michael Smith on HBO's John from Cincinnati; Cromartie, John Henry and George Laszlo on FOX's Terminator: The Sarah Connor Chronicles; Roman Nevikov, a Russian gangster, on NBC's Life; and Mason Turner, a paralyzed serial killer on Criminal Minds. He played Simon Escher in the Burn Notice third-season finale airing March 4, 2010 on USA, later reprising the role in the show's fourth and seventh seasons.

Dillahunt appeared in such films as The Assassination of Jesse James by the Coward Robert Ford, No Country for Old Men, The Road, Winter's Bone, The Last House On The Left, TalhotBlonde, and the indie horror film, Burning Bright.

From 2010 to 2014, Dillahunt co-starred as Burt Chance on the Fox comedy Raising Hope. He began a recurring role on The Mindy Project in 2015 and on The Guest Book in 2017.

Dillahunt starred in the 2018 action film Braven directed by Lin Oeding. Dillahunt played Kassen, the leader of a group of mercenaries and drug runners who retrieve the drug stash and plan to kill Joe Braven and his family. He joined the regular cast of the fourth season of Fear the Walking Dead as John Dorie.

Personal life
In 2007, Dillahunt married actress Michelle Hurd.

Filmography

Film

Television

References

External links

 
 
 

1964 births
Male actors from Washington (state)
Male actors from California
American male film actors
American male stage actors
American male television actors
Living people
Tisch School of the Arts alumni
People from Castro Valley, California
People from Selah, Washington
Outstanding Performance by a Cast in a Motion Picture Screen Actors Guild Award winners
University of Washington College of Arts and Sciences alumni
20th-century American male actors
21st-century American male actors